The Flylab Tucano is an Italian ultralight aircraft, produced by Flylab, of Ischitella. The aircraft is supplied as a kit for amateur construction or as a complete ready-to-fly-aircraft. The aircraft was produced in the 1990s by Ferrari ULM of Castelbaldo.

Design and development
The Tucano is a derivative of the Chotia Weedhopper and was designed to comply with the Fédération Aéronautique Internationale microlight rules with the design goal of being a low-cost aircraft. It features a strut-braced parasol wing, a two-seats-in-side-by-side configuration enclosed or open cockpit, fixed tricycle landing gear or floats and a single engine in pusher configuration or on some models twin engines in centreline thrust arrangement.

The aircraft is made from bolted-together aluminum tubing, with its flying surfaces covered in Dacron sailcloth. There is a cabane strut that passes through the windshield and cockpit area. The aircraft is built around a central bent aluminum keel tube that runs from the cockpit to the tail. Controls are standard three-axis type. Standard engines available are the  Rotax 503 and  Rotax 582 two-stroke powerplants. The fuel tank is of plastic construction, mounted under the pusher engine. The Tucano V has a glide ratio of 11:1.

Variants

Tucano
Base model with Rotax 582 powerplant.
Tucano V
Improved model, with aerodynamic clean-ups and enclosed cockpit
Tucano HV
A Tucano V mounted on floats (hydro).
Tucano Delta3
Open cockpit model powered by a Rotax 503
Tucano HD3
Float-equipped model based on the Tucano Delta3, powered by a Rotax 503
Tucano HD3A
Amphibious float-equipped model based on the Tucano HD3, powered by a Rotax 503
Tucano Delta3 TW
Twin-engined (TW) version with Rotax 582 engines mounted in the nose and aft of the cockpit, based on the Tucano Delta3
Tucano Delta3 VTW
Twin-engined version with Rotax 582 engines mounted in the nose and aft of the cockpit, with the Tucano V aerodynamic and cockpit refinements
Tucano X2
Twin-engined version with Rotax 582 engines mounted in the nose and aft of the cockpit, produced in the 1990s by Ferrari ULM.

Specifications (Tucano V)

References

External links

1990s Italian ultralight aircraft
Homebuilt aircraft
Light-sport aircraft
Single-engined pusher aircraft
Twin-engined push-pull aircraft